Thomas Anderson may refer to:

Arts and entertainment
Thomas Anderson (actor) (1905–1996), American actor
T. J. Anderson (Thomas Jefferson Anderson, born 1928), African American composer, conductor, orchestrator and educator
Thomas Anderson (musician), American musician
Neo (The Matrix), (Thomas A. Anderson), central character from The Matrix
Mr. Anderson (Beavis and Butt-head) (Thomas T. Anderson), character from the animated series Beavis and Butt-Head

Law and politics
Thomas Lilbourne Anderson (1808–1885), American lawyer and politician in the U.S. House of Representatives from Missouri
Thomas Wesley Anderson (1828–1916), American politician from Wisconsin
Thomas H. Anderson (judge) (1848–1916), United States federal judge
Thomas C. Anderson (1858–1931), American political boss and state legislator in New Orleans, Louisiana
Thomas Arnold Anderson (1871–1939), Canadian politician in Saskatchewan, Canada
Thomas J. Anderson (1910–2002), American politician, presidential candidate, author and publisher
Thomas Anderson (New Mexico politician) (born 1933), American politician, member of the New Mexico House of Representatives
Thomas H. Anderson Jr. (born 1946), American diplomat
S. Thomas Anderson, American judge in Tennessee

Military
Thomas Oakley Anderson (1783–1844), American naval officer during the Barbary Wars, 1803–1805
Thomas M. Anderson (1836–1917), American army general
Thomas Anderson (Medal of Honor) (1841–1912), American soldier, Civil War Medal of Honor recipient
Thomas Victor Anderson (1881–1972), Canadian major-general and former Chief of the General Staff

Science and medicine
Thomas Anderson (chemist) (1819–1874), Scottish organic chemist
Thomas Anderson (botanist) (1832–1870), Scottish botanist
Thomas McCall Anderson (1836–1908), Scottish physician and professor of practice of medicine
Thomas David Anderson (1853–1932), Scottish astronomer
Thomas F. Anderson (1911–1991), American biophysical chemist and geneticist
Thomas E. Anderson (born 1961), American computer scientist

Sports

Association football (soccer)
Thomas Anderson (footballer, born 1897) (1897–?), Scottish professional footballer
Thomas Anderson (footballer, born 1916), English professional footballer
Tommy Anderson (footballer) (born 1934), Scottish professional footballer
Thomas Anderson (English footballer), English professional footballer

Other sports
Thomas Anderson (rugby) (1863–1938), Scottish rugby player
Thomas Anderson (sailor) (1939–2010), Australian sailor and Olympic champion
Thomas Anderson (tennis), British tennis player in 1938 Wimbledon Championships – Men's Singles

Others
Thomas Brown Anderson (1796–1873), Canadian merchant, banker, and member of the Special Council of Lower Canada
Thomas Anderson (trade unionist) (1888–1964), New Zealand seaman and trade unionist

See also
Thomas Andersson (born 1956), Swedish footballer
Thomas Andersson (footballer, born 1968), Swedish footballer
Tom Anderson (disambiguation)
Tommy Anderson (disambiguation)